Diana Express is a Bulgarian rock band formed by Mitko Shterev in 1974 in Yambol.

Between 1974-1984, he discovers and creates Diana Express with young artists, whom later became stars: Vasil Naydenov, George Stanchev, Iliya Angelov

For a short time in the Diana Express transfers Chocho Vladovski, Yuksel Ahmedov from Fonoekspres. Some of the most popular songs are Sineva with Vasil Naidenov, Soul with George Stanchev, Blues For Two by Ilia Angelov.

In 1998, released a CD with the most popular of Diana Express, a new dance arrangement, as most of the songs are performed by young singer Gaul.

Lately, the band teamed with English hard rock singer John Lawton for their latest album, "The Power Of Mind" (2012).

Albums
 Диана Експрес 1/1974
 Диана експрес 2/1976
 Диана експрес 3/1980
 Молитва за дъжд/1981
 Диана експрес 4/1983
 Златна ябълка/1983
 Диана Експрес 5/1984
 Най-доброто от "Диана Експрес"/1995 
 Dance Remixes/1998 
 Осъдени Души/1998 
 Ябълката На Греха/2002 
 Златна Колекция/2005 
 Текстове
 Златна колекция-30 години 2005
 Утре 
 Душа
 Влюбено сърце 
 Молитва за дъжд  
 Северина  
 Блус за двама  
 Наследство  
 Балада за Пловдив  
 Признание
 Изгубена любов
 Минавам на червена светлина 
 Всяка песен е любов  
 Есен  
 Златна ябълка
 Нежно постоянство
Какво не ти достига
 Синева 
 Диана и ловецът 
 Хоровод
 Родопчанка

References

External links
 Diana Express at Bulgarian Rock Archives
 Митко Щерев съблече "Диана Експрес": Композиторът описа истината за групата в книга и я издаде със златен албум (standartnews.com), 13.05.2006

Bulgarian rock music groups
1974 establishments in Bulgaria
Musical groups established in 1974
Musical groups disestablished in 1984
Musical groups established in 2002
Culture in Yambol